Franz Georg von Schönborn-Buchheim (15 June 1682 – 18 January 1756) was the Archbishop-Elector of Trier from 1729 until 1756, and the Prince-Bishop of Worms and Prince-Provost of Ellwangen from 1732 until 1756.

Biography
Franz Georg was born in Mainz, the ninth son of the Count of Schönborn and the nephew of Lothar Franz von Schönborn, the Archbishop-Elector of Mainz. Franz Georg's brothers were Johann Philipp Franz, Friedrich Karl and Hugo Damian, all three important churchmen. Beginning in 1702 he studied law, philosophy, theology, geography, history, and language at Salzburg, Siena, and Leiden. After completing his studies he travelled to the Vatican, Spain, and England. Through the influence of his uncle, Franz Georg gained valuable contacts in the court of the Holy Roman Emperor in Vienna. After his uncle died in 1729 and Franz Ludwig, Archbishop-Elector of Trier, succeeded him after vacating his own see, Franz Georg was unanimously elected the new Archbishop of Trier and thus appointed Prince-Elector of Trier. Owing to the protection of the Papacy in 1732 he was also elected the Prince-Bishop of Worms and the Prince-Provost of Ellwangen Abbey.

Politically Franz Georg sided with the House of Habsburg, and through it the Archbishopric-Electorate of Trier became involved in the great conflicts of the day. In the second half of his reign, Franz Georg retired from active involvement in politics, and focused on administration and construction projects. From 1737 until 1753 he constructed a Baroque residence in Ellwangen. Beginning in 1739 he began the extension of the Philippsburg in Koblenz. He also constructed a new summer residence, Schönbornslust. Despite being pious, Franz Georg worked hard to increase the level of education amongst the populace. He outlawed several pilgrimages, holidays and exorcisms. Towards the end of his life Franz Georg's power declined with that of his family. He died in Philippsburg in 1756 and was buried in the Cathedral of Trier.

 

|-

|-

1682 births
1756 deaths
Clergy from Mainz
Francis 02
Roman Catholic bishops of Worms
18th-century Roman Catholic archbishops in the Holy Roman Empire
Franz Georg